Emmanuel Cosquin (1841 – 1919) was a French folklorist. He wrote the "Popular Tales of Lorraine," in the introduction to which he argues for the theory that the development as well as the origin of such tales is historically traceable to India.

Publications
 Contes populaires de Lorraine (Paris, 1860) - two volumes
 Les Contes indiens et l'occident: petites monographies folkloriques à propos de contes Maures. Paris: Édouard Champion. 1922.

External links
 
 Works by or about Emmanuel Cosquin at Gutenberg Project

1841 births
1919 deaths
French folklorists
French male writers